Bogolubovia is a genus of pterosaur from the Upper Cretaceous (early Campanian) Rybushka Formation of Petrovsk, Saratov Oblast, Russia. It is named for Nikolai Nikolaevich Bogolubov, the paleontologist who discovered the remains in 1914. It was in 1991 assigned to the Azhdarchidae. Wellnhofer (1991) however, retained it in the Pteranodontidae. Bogolubov had initially assigned the specimen, consisting of a single partial large cervical vertebra, as a new species of Ornithostoma, O. orientalis. It was later reclassified as a species of Pteranodon, before being assigned its own genus by Lev Nesov and Alexander Yarkov in 1989. The holotype has probably been lost, but other partial remains have been referred to the genus.

Most modern paleontologists consider it a probable member of the family Azhdarchidae. In 2008 however, it was considered to be a nomen dubium that might in fact be identical to the genus Volgadraco, another pterosaur from Russia. However, new remains described in 2022 suggest that Bogulobovia and Volgadraco were both valid species of pteranodontids.

Bogolubovia would have been a mid-sized pterosaur, with an estimated wingspan of 3–4 meters (9.8–13 feet) suggested by the holotype; a later found radius indicates a wingspan of 4.3 meters.

See also
 Timeline of pterosaur research

References 

Late Cretaceous pterosaurs of Europe
Azhdarchids
Fossil taxa described in 1989